Rich Rich  is the sixth studio album by Turkish-German rapper Ufo361 and was released through Stay High on 24 April 2020. The album contains 13 songs. It was produced by Coop The Truth, The Cratez, Gezin of 808 Mafia, Jimmy Torrio, OZ, Sonus030 and Tay Keith.

Track listing

Charts

Weekly charts

Year-end charts

References

2020 albums
Ufo361 albums
German-language albums
Albums produced by Tay Keith